Mykhailo Reznik (birth: February 5, 1950, Kiev, Ukraine) is a Ukrainian diplomat. He served as Ambassador Extraordinary and Plenipotentiary of Ukraine to China from 2001 to 2003 and Ambassador of Ukraine to the United States from 2003 until 2005.

Education 
Mykhailo Reznik in 1972 he graduated from Kyiv National University of Trade and Economics. Academy of Leadership courses and Stanford Business School and the University of Washington School of Foreign Languages biennial.

Career 
1972 — 1993 — worked in the Ministry of Trade of Ukraine, in senior positions in the Kiev city administration and the Republican Main caterers, led by manufacturing and export-import association.

1993 — 1994 — First Deputy Minister of Foreign Economic Relations of Ukraine.

1994 — 1997 — Sales Representative of Ukraine to the United States.

09.1997 — 10.2001 — Ambassador Extraordinary and Plenipotentiary of Ukraine to the South Korea

10.2001 — 11.2003 — Ambassador Extraordinary and Plenipotentiary of Ukraine to China

2002 — 11.2003 — Ambassador Extraordinary and Plenipotentiary of Ukraine to the North Korea

06.2002 — 11.2003 — Ambassador Extraordinary and Plenipotentiary of Ukraine to Mongolia concurrently.

11.2003 — 2005 — Ambassador Extraordinary and Plenipotentiary of Ukraine to the United States.

07.2004 — 2005 — Ambassador Extraordinary and Plenipotentiary of Ukraine in Antigua and Barbuda concurrently.

President of the Association of Automobile Manufacturers of Ukraine "Ukrautoprom"

Vice-President of the Ice Hockey Federation of Ukraine.

References

External links
 Mykhailo B. Reznik
 NEW UKRAINIAN AMBASSADOR SEEKS CLOSER TIES WITH COMMUNITY
 UKRAINIAN AMBASSADOR TO CHINA MYKHAILO REZNIK FORECAST TRADE TURNOVER BETWEEN UKRAINE AND CHINA AS LIKELY TO BE RECORD HIGH THIS YEAR
 Address of H.E. Mykhailo B. Reznik, Ambassador Extraordinary and Plenipotentiary of Ukraine, on the Occasion of the Independence Day of Ukraine
 Easter Greetings from H.E. Mykhailo B. Reznik, Ambassador Extraordinary and Plenipotentiary of Ukraine to the United States
 26th Annual Ambassadors Ball Salute to the Diplomatic Corps

Living people
1950 births
Diplomats from Kyiv
Ambassadors of Ukraine to the United States
Ambassadors of Ukraine to China
Ambassadors of Ukraine to South Korea
Ambassadors of Ukraine to North Korea
Ambassadors of Ukraine to Mongolia
Ambassadors of Ukraine to Antigua and Barbuda
Ukrainian politicians
Kyiv National University of Trade and Economics alumni